Roman Ferber (born 29 May 1993) is a Belgian footballer who currently plays for Patro Eisden in the Belgian First National Division.

External links

 Roman Ferber Interview

1993 births
Living people
Belgian footballers
Association football defenders
R. Charleroi S.C. players
R.A.E.C. Mons players
Royal Excel Mouscron players
Royale Union Saint-Gilloise players
Francs Borains players
Royal FC Mandel United players
K. Patro Eisden Maasmechelen players
Belgian Pro League players